Almáttki áss (the almighty áss "god") is an unknown Norse god evoked in an Icelandic legal oath sworn on a temple ring, mentioned in Landnámabók (Hauksbók 268).

Attestations
The reference in Landnámabók is found in a section describing the old heathen laws for how one should swear legal oaths:

Theories
The identity of this divinity has given rise to much speculation.

Thor
The identification with Thor is by far the most common. The adjective "almighty" applies particularly well to him and he had a prominent position by the time of the settlement of Iceland.

Ullr
The almáttki áss can be identified with Ullr for in Atlakviða (30) Gudrún mentions the oaths Gunnar sworn by Ull's ring. Rudolf Simek theorizes that this hypothesis was in contradiction with the insignificance of the cult of Ullr.

Odin
The expression could also refer to Odin, represented in much of the Old Norse corpus as the important god of the Norse pantheon.

Týr
Rudolf Simek also suggested that the almáttki áss might be Týr. Even if this god was little known in Iceland, the oath was a legal one and Týr was historically linked to law (cf. Mars Thingsus)..

Christianity
Finally, as the oath was transmitted by a Christian author, the  could have a Christian meaning. John Lindow thus suggested that maybe the author "meant the 'almighty áss' to be a noble pagan anticipation of the new religion that was to come". Régis Boyer shares this opinion, underscoring that the word "almáttki" is nowhere else to be found in a pagan context.

See also
 Regnator omnium deus (Latin 'god, ruler of all'), a deity mentioned by Tacitus in 1 CE as venerated by the Semnones

Notes

References

Bibliography

Primary

Secondary
 Livre de la colonisation de l'Islande selon la version de Sturla Þórðarson (Sturlubók). Traduit de l'islandais ancien, annoté et commenté par Régis Boyer. Turnhout: Brepols, 2000. Miroir du Moyen Âge. .
 Lindow, John. Norse Mythology: A Guide to the Gods, Heroes, Rituals, and Beliefs. New York: Oxford University Press, 2002. .
 Simek, Rudolf. Dictionary of Northern Mythology. Translated by Angela Hall. Cambridge: D. S. Brewer, 1996. .

Æsir
Norse gods
Open problems
Thor
Odin